Rožnik is a hill in the Rožnik District and Šiška District northwest of the Ljubljana city center. Together with Tivoli City Park, it forms Tivoli–Rožnik Hill–Šiška Hill Landscape Park. Extending from Tivoli Park, it is a popular hiking, running, and excursion destination for residents of Ljubljana.

Name

Rožnik Hill was attested in written sources in 1326 as Rosenberch. The Slovene name is a translation from the German name Rosenberg, originally a compound of Middle High German rôse 'rose' and berc 'mountain, hill'. In modern German the hill was known as Rosenbach.

Geography

The hill has two peaks, called Šiška Hill (429 m) and Cankar Peak (394 m). Cankar Peak was formerly known as Zgornji Rožnik ('upper Rožnik'), in contrast to Spodnji Rožnik ('lower Roznik'; also known as Podrožnik) at the base of the hill, where the Čad Inn is located. On Cankar Peak stands Visitation Church and an inn where the writer Ivan Cankar lived between 1910 and 1917. Below it, on the southern slope of the hill, is the Ljubljana Zoo.

Events
May 1: on May Day, a bonfire is lit on Cankar Peak and a festival is held in the nearby meadow.
June 21: a summer solstice ceremony takes place with a bonfire on Cankar Peak to celebrate the winners of the Kresnik Award, named after the Slavic pagan deity Kresnik, invoking Slavic pagan ceremonies from before Christianization.
December 26: horses are blessed on St. Stephen's Day in front of Visitation Church.

References

External links

Hills of Slovenia
Geography of Ljubljana
Rožnik District